"Dawn of X" is a 2019 relaunch of the X-Men line of comic books published by Marvel Comics in the wake of the twin miniseries House of X and Powers of X. This initiative culminated in the crossover event X of Swords, which was followed by a sequel relaunch named "Reign of X" in December 2020.

Publication history
The initiative was announced at "The Next Big Thing" panel as San Diego Comic-Con 2019, intended to tell the story of mutantkind in a new status quo established by Jonathan Hickman after the House of X/Powers of X (HOX/POX) event concluded, redefining X-Men as a brand and its place in the Marvel Universe, with all creative teams working closely under Hickman's supervision.

Titles

Prelude series

Ongoing series

Limited series

One-shots

Giant-Size X-Men

X of Swords

Other

Release order 

 House of X #1
 Powers of X #1
 House of X #2
 Powers of X #2
 Powers of X #3
 House of X #3
 House of X #4
 Powers of X #4
 House of X #5
 Powers of X #5
 House of X #6
 Powers of X #6
 X-Men #1
 Marauders #1
 Excalibur #1
 New Mutants #1
 X-Force #1
 Fallen Angels #1
 X-Men #2
 Excalibur #2
 Marauders #2
 New Mutants #2
 X-Force #2
 Fallen Angels #2
 X-Men #3
 Marauders #3
 Excalibur #3
 New Mutants #3
 X-Force #3
 Fallen Angels #3
 Marauders #4
 Excalibur #4
 New Mutants #4
 X-Force #4
 Fallen Angels #4
 X-Men #4
 Marauders #5
 Excalibur #5
 New Mutants #5
 X-Force #5
 Fallen Angels #5
 Marauders #6
 Excalibur #6
 X-Men #5
 Fallen Angels #6
 New Mutants #6
 X-Force #6
 Marauders #7
 Excalibur #7
 X-Force #7
 X-Men #6
 Marauders #8
 New Mutants #7
 Wolverine #1
 Giant-Size X-Men: Jean Grey and Emma Frost #1
 New Mutants #8
 X-Force #8
 X-Men #7
 Excalibur #8
 Marauders #9
 Cable #1
 New Mutants #9
 X-Men #8
 Excalibur #9
 X-Force #9
 Giant-Size X-Men: Nightcrawler #1
 Hellions #1
 Wolverine #2
 X-Men #9
 Marauders #10
 Excalibur #10
 New Mutants #10
 X-Force #10 
 Free Comic Book Day: X-Men #1
 Giant-Size X-Men: Magneto #1
 New Mutants #11
 Wolverine #3
 Hellions #2
 Empyre: X-Men #1
 X-Factor #1
 Cable #2
 X-Men #10
 Giant-Size X-Men: Fantomex #1
 Empyre: X-Men #2
 Empyre: X-Men #3
 Marauders #11
 X-Force #11
 Empyre: X-Men #4
 Excalibur #11
 Wolverine #4
 Cable #3
 Hellions #3
 X-Factor #2
 X-Men #11
 Cable #4
 New Mutants #12
 Wolverine #5
 X-Force #12
 X-Factor #3
 Marauders #12
 Hellions #4
 Excalibur #12
 Giant Size X-Men: Storm #1
 X-Men #12
 Juggernaut #1
 X of Swords: Creation #1
 X-Factor #4
 Wolverine #6
 X-Force #13
 Marauders #13
 Hellions #5
 New Mutants #13
 Cable #5
 Excalibur #13
 X-Men #13
 X of Swords: Stasis #1
 X-Men #14
 Marauders #14
 Marauders #15 
 Excalibur #14 
 Wolverine #7
 X-Force #14
 Hellions #6
 Cable #6
 X-Men #15
 Excalibur #15
 X of Swords: Destruction #1

Premise
Mutants are offered asylum on the island of Krakoa, ruled under a council formed by Professor X, Magneto and Apocalypse, among others. While several factions deal with their own issues, Moira MacTaggert warns them all about an incoming threat that may doom mutantkind, and probably the whole world.

Storylines

Reading order 

Issues marked in bold are marked as red/important in the issue list found in the back of each comic.

 House of X #1
 Powers of X #1
 House of X #2 Powers of X #2
 Powers of X #3
 House of X #3
 House of X #4
 Powers of X #4
 House of X #5 Powers of X #5
 House of X #6
 Powers of X #6 X-Men #1
 Marauders #1
 Excalibur #1
 New Mutants #1–2, 5, 7
 New Mutants #3–4, 6
 X-Force #1
 Fallen Angels #1–6
 X-Men #2–3
 Incoming! #1
 Wolverine #1.A–3
 Marauders #2–6
 X-Force #2–3
 Excalibur #2–6
 X-Force #4–5
 X-Men #4–6
 X-Force #6
 Marauders #7–10
 X-Force #7–8
 Giant-Size X-Men: Jean Grey and Emma Frost #1
 Excalibur #7–8
 New Mutants #8
 Cable #1–4
 New Mutants #9–12
 X-Men #8–9
 Excalibur #9–12
 X-Force #9–10
 Giant-Size X-Men: Nightcrawler #1
 Hellions #1–4
 Giant-Size X-Men: Magneto #1
 Empyre: X-Men #1–4
 X-Men #10–11
 X-Factor #1–3
 Giant-Size X-Men: Fantomex #1
 Marauders #11–12
 X-Force #11–12
 Giant-Size X-Men: Storm #1
 X-Men #12
 X of Swords: Creation #1 X-Factor #4
 Wolverine #6
 X-Force #13
 Marauders #13
 Hellions #5
 New Mutants #13
 Cable #5
 Excalibur #13
 X-Men #13
 X of Swords: Stasis #1
 X-Men #14
 Marauders #14–15
 Excalibur #14
 Wolverine #7
 X-Force #14
 Hellions #6
 Cable #6
 X-Men #15
 Excalibur #15
 X of Swords: Destruction #1

 Collected editions 

 Related material 
 Marvel Comics #1000
 Written by Al Ewing et al., drawn by Various Artists.
 A brief glimpse at major events throughout Marvel's 80 years of publishing.
 Includes a short one-page story written by Hickman about Apocalypse and the Four Horseman.
 Incoming! #1
 An 80-page State-of-the-Union of Marvel Comics, staged around a murder mystery that would tease the Marvel event Empyre.
 Includes a short story written by Hickman about Mr. Sinister, teasing X-Men/Fantastic Four.
  Gwenpool Strikes Back #5
 Written by Leah Williams and drawn by David Baldeon.
 Gwenpool goes to Krakoa, encountering Wolverine and Quentin Quire.
 X-Men/Fantastic Four (vol. 2)
 Written by Chip Zdarsky and drawn by Terry Dodson.
 Franklin Richards must decide whether to stay with the Fantastic Four, or to stay in Krakoa.
 Weapon Plus: World War IV #1
 Written by Benjamin Percy, illustrated by Georges Jeanty
 Involves elements touched on in X-Force #6, as well as the Weapon X program. 
 Backup story titled Brute Force directly references Orchis.
 Black Cat #9–10
 Written by Jed MacKay, Drawn by Kris Anka. 
 Not crucial to the entirety of Dawn of X, but Black Cat teams up with Wolverine, and they discuss Krakoa once or twice.
 Deadpool #6
 Written by Kelly Thompson, Drawn by Kevin Libranda. 
 Deadpool visits Krakoa.
 Runaways #34-35
 Written by Rainbow Rowell, Drawn by Andrés Genolet.
 Now that Krakoa is open to all mutants, will Molly abandon her friends and join her new family?
 Features Wolverine and Pixie.
Fantastic Four #26
Written by Dan Slott, Drawn by R.B. Silva
Professor X reveals to Franklin Richards that Franklin is not and never has been a mutant and is therefore unwelcome in Krakoa.

References

 The release dates of these series is currently unknown due to the COVID-19 pandemic.

X-Men storylines
Comic book reboots
Utopian fiction
Comic books suspended due to the COVID-19 pandemic